Suburban refers to the suburbs of a metropolitan area.

Suburban may also refer to:

Vehicles
 Station wagon or "suburban", a type of automobile
 Suburban (1911 automobile), a roadster produced in Detroit, Michigan, US
 Chevrolet Suburban, a model of sport utility vehicle manufactured by General Motors since 1934; also badged as GMC Suburban 1937–1999
 Holden Suburban, a version of the Chevrolet Suburban sold in Australia and New Zealand 1998–2001
 DeSoto Suburban, a Chrysler automobile model 1946–1954
 Plymouth Suburban, a station wagon 1949–1978

Other uses
 Sub Urban (musician) (born 1999), American pop singer
 Suburban Records, a Dutch record label
 Suburban Station, an underground commuter rail station in Philadelphia, Pennsylvania, US
 The Suburban, an English-language weekly newspaper in Quebec, Canada

See also
 Suburbia (disambiguation)
 The Suburbs (disambiguation)